The Dhofar pipistrelle (Pipistrellus dhofarensis) is a species of vesper bat in the genus Pipistrellus. It is found in Southern Arabia, including Oman and Yemen.

Taxonomy
Pipistrellus dhofarensis was described as a new species in 2016. The holotype was collected at Ain Tabruq spring in the Dhofar Governorate of Oman, which is reflected in its species name "dhofarensis".

Description
Pipistrellus dhofarensis is considered a medium- or large-bodied bat relative to other Pipistrellus species. It has a robust skull with a long and broad snout; the braincase is broad and very high. Two color variations are known: some individuals are grayish-brown with a silvery tint, while others are reddish-brown. Both color morphs have belly fur that is paler than their back fur. Its face, ears, and wing membranes are all dark grayish-brown.

Range and habitat
The species occurs in a very limited area situated between easternmost Yemen and south-western Oman. Its habitat is humid savanna. It is one of four bat species that are endemic to Southern Arabia, the other three being the Yemeni mouse-tailed bat, Yemeni trident leaf-nosed bat, and the Arabian trident bat.

References

dhofarensis
Mammals described in 2016
Bats of Asia